Aathi or known as Aadhi is a 2006 Indian Tamil-language action thriller film, directed by Ramana and produced by S. A. Chandrasekhar. Starring Vijay in the lead role, it is a remake of the 2005 Telugu film Athanokkade.

The film released on 15 January 2006. It received to mixed reviews, and performed below average.

Plot
The film starts by with Anjali sitting on a bench in Rameswaram feeding a white pigeon by a calm ocean. A retired police officer Shankar comes and sits on the bench by her side, and they exchange pleasantries. Suddenly, she whips out a knife and kills him with the help of her paternal uncle Ramachandran, while saying that she has been waiting for this moment for many years. She then comes back to Chennai with Ramachandran to attend college.

After that, the scene shifts to Aathi, who lives in New Delhi with his family consisting of his parents Mani and Lakshmi, who are both loving to him, and his sister. He takes up a course in a college in Chennai against his parents' wishes. Unable to be separated from Aadhi, his family comes to Chennai along with him.

It is revealed that Anjali is studying in the same college as Aadhi, and she has her own agenda to seek revenge on her family's killers, and she is assisted by Ramachandran. Meanwhile, RDX, a local gangster, enters and is shown to have a dispute with Pattabhi. To exact their revenge, Ramachandran attempts to kill Sadha, one of RDX's henchmen, but fails to do so since Aadhi kills Sadha with a gun he was armed with. At first naturally, RDX assumes the killer can be none other than Pattabhi, so he kills him. However, Aathi arrives on the scene with help from Bullet, his college classmate who is a comical rowdy. Aathi threatens RDX telling that he was the one who killed Sadha, and that he will also kill Abdullah. As typical and usual, Abdullah gets angry and goes to kill Aathi but fails, and Aathi beheads Abdullah, while his family witnessed this act with horror. Soon it is revealed that Aathi was their adopted son and he is actually their a on a personal mission to eliminate the people behind the murder of his blood biological family. Aathi reveals his flashback to his foster parents.

Aathi's biological father was an honest cop who arrested one of RDX's henchmen. It is revealed that Anjali and Aadhi are from the same family as Anjali's father is Aathi's maternal uncle. RDX pays Aathi's house a visit and asks his grandfather to let his henchmen go. When Aathi's grandfather refuses, RDX threatens them, only to find knives being held at him by Aadhi and his cousins. Aathi's father arrives and arrests RDX. Infuriated, he pays them a visit with some of his henchmen and Shankar. Together, they murder the whole extended family. Only Anjali, Ramachandran, and Aathi survived the blast that annihilated their family. After the house is blown up by RDX, Aadhi escapes and is taken in by a couple who later became his foster parents.
 
On finding out his past, Aathi's foster parents request him to come back to New Delhi, but he refuses. He then takes them to the railway station, but is nearly ambushed by RDX's men. He succeeds on defeating them in a fight and meets RDX, warning him to bring his brother Robert from Dubai, whom he promises to kill. Soon, Robert arrives, and in revenge, kills Ramachandran, while challenging Aathi to meet him at RDX's place. Aathi came after finding out that RDX kidnapped Anjali and held her hostage by his henchmen in the library of their college, which happens to be the old house that Aathi, Anjali, and their family lived in. Aathi escapes after killing Robert with his own gun. RDX's men hold Anjali hostage, but she is saved by Bullet and the other students in the college. In a thrilling climax, Aathi kills RDX and is shown to be leaving and reuniting with Anjali, the only one left in his family.

Cast

Production
Chandrasekhar bought the remake rights of Telugu film Athanokkade (2005) to make it in Tamil with his son Vijay. Ramana, who earlier worked with Vijay in Thirumalai (2003) was selected to direct this film.

Trisha was chosen to be the lead actress pairing with Vijay for third time after Ghilli (2004) and Thirupaachi (2005). Saikumar was chosen to portray the antagonist while Prakash Raj, Vivek, Naasar, Seetha and Manivannan were selected to portray supporting roles.

The song picturisation with a set costing  40 lakh was shot with around 50 dancers.

Music

The film has five songs composed by Vidyasagar.

The film includes two more songs not included in the audio soundtrack:
 "Varran Varran" sung by Tippu
 "Iruvar Vazhvum" sung by Karthik & Kalyani Nair

Release
The film released on 15 January 2006. The satellite rights of the film were sold to Kalaignar TV for  10 crore. Theatrical rights for Tamil Nadu were sold for  17 crore. The film didn't perform as well as expected, which Sify.com attributed to the film not being released on Pongal Day. The film released alongside Saravana and Paramasivan.

Despite being remade from Telugu, Aathi was dubbed and released in Telugu as Nenera Aadhi. The film was dubbed in Hindi as Aadhi Narayan by Eagle Movies in YouTube.

Reception
Ananda Vikatan rated the film 38 out of 100.

References

External links 
 

2000s Tamil-language films
2006 action films
2006 films
Films shot in Ooty
Indian action drama films
Indian films about revenge
2000s masala films
Films scored by Vidyasagar
Tamil remakes of Telugu films